Apted is a surname. Notable people with the surname include:

Charles R. Apted (1873–1941), American university staff member
Harry Apted (1925–2016), Fijian cricketer
Michael Apted (1941–2021), British director, producer, writer and actor
Paul Apted (1967–2014), British-American sound editor 
Roy Apted (born 1937), Australian rules footballer 
William Apted (born 1930), Fijian cricketer